Khukhra is a village in the Pirtand CD block in the Dumri subdivision of  the Giridih district in the Indian state of Jharkhand.

Geography

Location                               

Demographics
According to the 2011 Census of India, Khukhra had  total population of 1,017, of which 520 (51%) were males and 497 (49%) were females. Population in the age range 0–6 years was 172. The total number of literate persons in Khukhra was 555 (65.68% of the population over 6 years).

Civic administration

Police station
Khukhra police station serves the Pirtand CD block.

References

Villages in Giridih district